A Mounting Crisis...As Their Fury Got Released, released on May 25, 2005 by Yggr Drasill Records, is a full-length album by thrash metal band Grief of War. It was re-released on February 19, 2008 through Prosthetic Records.

Track listing

 "Hatred Burns" – 4:21
 "Rat Race" – 5:11
 "Sown By Greed" – 4:23
 "Don't Walk Away" – 4:35
 "Distrust" – 3:35
 "Eternal Curse" – 4:50
 "Blind from the Facts" – 6:25
 "Resist" – 2:07
 "Blood Lust" – 2:51
 "The Judgement Day" – 6:17

2008 albums
Prosthetic Records albums
Grief of War albums